Montclear is a major city in All Saints Northwest, Saint John, Antigua and Barbuda. It had a population of 1,246 in the 2011 census. It has an area of 0.7 square kilometres.

Demographics 
Montclear has five enumeration districts.

 35301 Montclear_1
 35302 Montclear_2
 35303 Montclear_3
 35304 Montclear_4
 35305 Montclear_5

References 

Montclear